Bhaktalilamrita is a text by Mahipati about the Varkari saint-poets.

Marathi-language literature
18th-century Indian books